X (formerly Google X) is an American semi-secret research and development facility and organization founded by Google in January 2010. X has its headquarters about a mile and a half from Alphabet's corporate headquarters, the Googleplex, in Mountain View, California.

X's mission is to invent and launch "moonshot" technologies that aim to make the world a radically better place. A moonshot is defined by X as the intersection of a big problem, a radical solution, and breakthrough technology. Work at X is overseen by entrepreneur scientist Astro Teller, as CEO and "Captain of Moonshots". The lab started with the development of Google's self-driving car.

On October 2, 2015, after the complete restructuring of Google into Alphabet, Google X was renamed to X.

Active projects

Glass

Project Glass is a research and development program by Google to develop an augmented reality head-mounted display (HMD). The intended purpose of Project Glass products would be the hands-free displaying of information currently available to most smartphone users, and allowing for interaction with the Internet via natural language voice commands. One Google Glass costs $1,500.

Taara
The purpose of Taara is to expand global access to fast, affordable internet with beams of light. After a successful use of free-space optical communication (FSOC) as a part of Project Loon, X decided to conduct more tests called Taara in rural areas of India. The technology uses light beams which are developed by X's office in Visakhapatnam. As of December 2017, X had set up 2,000 of these units in India, through a partnership with Andhra Pradesh State FiberNet Limited.

Chorus 
Chorus is a project which aims to improve the supply chain through the use of sensors, software and machine learning tools. The team had been working on the project for 3.5 years before it was revealed in March 2022.

Graduated projects

Waymo

Waymo was a project by Google that involved developing technology for driverless cars. In December 2016, Google transitioned the project into a new company called Waymo, housed under Google's parent company Alphabet. The project was led by Google engineer Sebastian Thrun, director of the Stanford Artificial Intelligence Laboratory and co-inventor of Google Street View.  Thrun's team at Stanford created the robotic vehicle Stanley which won the 2005 DARPA Grand Challenge and its  prize from the United States Department of Defense. The team developing the system consisted of 15 engineers working for Google, including Chris Urmson, Mike Montemerlo, and Anthony Levandowski, who had worked on the DARPA Grand and Urban Challenges.

Loon

Project Loon was a project of X that aimed to bring internet access to everyone by creating an internet network of balloons flying through the stratosphere. It uses wireless routers in balloons that are above weather and plans to give access to the internet to those who can't reach it or are in need of help. In July 2018, Loon graduated from X and was made a subsidiary of Alphabet. In January 2021, it was announced that the company would be shut down.

Wing

Project Wing was a project of X that aimed to rapidly deliver products across a city by using flying vehicles, similar to the Amazon Prime Air concept. It began development in secret around 2012, with full-scale testing being carried out in Australia. In 2014, the project was publicly announced, at the same time that it was spun off to a separate company, Wing.

The flying vehicle takes off vertically, then rotates to a horizontal position for flying around. For delivery, it hovers and winches packages down to the ground. At the end of the tether is a small bundle of electronics which detects that the package has hit the ground, detaches from the delivery, and is pulled back up into the body of the vehicle. Dropping the cargo or landing were found to be unfeasible, as users compromised the safety.

Malta
Malta was started in July 2017 to develop renewable energy storage systems by utilizing tanks of molten salt. The system works by transforming electrical energy to heat energy for storage, based on research by Robert B. Laughlin. Malta Inc. graduated from X in December 2018 with plans to develop a large-scale test of the technology for future commercial applications.

Dandelion 

Dandelion was spun out as a company not under the Alphabet umbrella, aiming to sell geothermal energy systems to consumers.

Makani

Makani was a project that was acquired by X in May 2013 designed to produce wind energy using kites. The T-shaped planes are 85 feet wide and contain 8 turbines tethered to the ground. Compared to wind turbines, Makani's kites require 90% less material. In December 2016, Makani's kite became the first energy kite in the world to generate electricity. In February 2019, Makani was separated from X and became a subsidiary of Alphabet.

In February 2020, Alphabet shut down Makani. The company said "Despite strong technical progress, the road to commercialization is longer and riskier than hoped." In September 2020, Makani released the Energy Kite Collection — a three-part report and accompanying collection of open source code repositories, flight logs and technical videos from the project. It also released Pulling Power from the Sky: The Story of Makani, a documentary on the project, and made a non-assertion pledge on its patent portfolio, allowing anyone to use its patents without fear of legal reprisal.

Intrinsic 
In July 2021, it was announced that a new company called Intrinsic would be spun out of X. The team had been developing software for industrial robots at X for more than five years. The new company is led by Wendy Tan White as CEO.

Mineral 
In January 2023, it was announced that a new company called Mineral has been spun out of X. The team had been working on sensors, data, and machine learning to scale sustainable agriculture globally for more than 5 years. The new company is led by Elliott Grant as CEO.

Others
 The Google Contact Lens, a smart contact lens that aims to assist people with diabetes by constantly measuring the glucose levels in their tears, was announced by Google on January 16, 2014. This project, the nanodiagnostics project to develop a cancer-detecting pill, and other life sciences efforts are now being carried out by Verily.
 Google Brain is now a deep learning research project at Google which started as an X project. Considered one of the biggest successes, this one project has produced enough value for Google to more than cover the total costs of X, according to Astro Teller.
 Google Watch (now Wear OS)
 Gcam (now Google Camera) 
 Project Insight, mapping indoor spaces, now integrated into Google Maps
 Flux, a tool for designing more eco-friendly buildings
 Daydream View
 Chronicle

Projects with unknown status
 A 2011 New York Times article stated that computer scientist Johnny Chung Lee was working on web of things-related research; this might have evolved into the Tango project (2014-2018), which was done not at Google X but at Google ATAP.
 A 2015 article in The Wall Street Journal stated that Google X had, since 2012, been working on long-lasting smartphone batteries.

Abandoned or rejected projects
In October 2013, the existence of four Google barges was revealed, with the vessels registered under the dummy corporation By And Large. Two of the barges had a superstructure whose construction was kept under the utmost secrecy. These were eventually revealed to be experimental floating interactive learning centers, though perhaps due to the cost of meeting federal maritime safety regulations, this project was cancelled and the barges dismantled and sold.
 Foghorn, a project to produce liquid hydrocarbon fuel for vehicles using sea water as a source of carbon dioxide, extracted using membrane technology, and also as a source of hydrogen, using electrolysis. The project was killed by X in 2016 and the results published in 2018.
 Calcifer explored using lighter-than-air vehicles to move freight at lower cost in countries with poor transportation infrastructure. Abandoned in 2014 due to the high cost of prototyping and limited expected impact.

Projects that X has considered and rejected include a space elevator, which was deemed to be currently infeasible; a hoverboard, which was determined to be too costly relative to the societal benefits; a user-safe jetpack, which was thought to be too loud and energy-wasting; and teleportation, which was found to violate the laws of physics.

Approach
In February 2016, Astro Teller, the X "Captain of Moonshots", gave a TED talk in which he described the X approach to projects. Unusual characteristics of the approach included constantly trying to find reasons to kill off projects by tackling the hardest parts first, and both celebrating and rewarding staff when projects were killed off due to failure.

On May 17, 2018, an internal video entitled The Selfish Ledger was leaked by The Verge, regarding reshaping society through total data collection. A spokesperson stated that "This is a thought-experiment by the Design team from years ago that uses a technique known as ‘speculative design’ to explore uncomfortable ideas and concepts in order to provoke discussion and debate. It's not related to any current or future products."

Acquisitions
A number of companies have been acquired and merged into X, covering a diverse range of skills including wind turbines, robotics, artificial intelligence, humanoid robots, robotic arms, and computer vision. In 2013, X acquired Makani Power, a US company which develops tethered wings/kites with mounted wind turbines for low cost renewable energy generation. In 2014, it acquired product design and mechanical engineering firm Gecko Design, whose previous products included the Fitbit activity tracker and low-cost computers. As of 2015, X has acquired 14 companies: among them are Redwood Robotics, Meka Robotics, Boston Dynamics, Bot & Dolly, and Jetpac. In June 2017, X sold Boston Dynamics to SoftBank Group, which later sold it to Hyundai Motor Company in December 2020.

Campus
A reporter from Bloomberg Businessweek visited the site in 2013 and described it as "ordinary two-story red-brick buildings about a half-mile from Google's main campus. There's a burbling fountain out front and rows of company-issued bikes, which employees use to shuttle to the main campus."

Controversies 
On 25 October 2018, The New York Times published an exposé entitled, "How Google Protected Andy Rubin, the 'Father of Android'". The company subsequently announced that "48 employees have been fired over the last two years" for sexual misconduct. A week after the article appeared, Google X executive Rich DeVaul resigned pursuant to a complaint of sexual harassment.

See also 

 Artificial intelligence
 Glossary of artificial intelligence
 Google Labs
 Skunkworks project

References

External links

 

 
Alphabet Inc.
Alphabet Inc. subsidiaries
Research organizations in the United States
Science and technology in the San Francisco Bay Area
Companies based in Mountain View, California
Technology companies based in the San Francisco Bay Area
Technology companies established in 2010
2010 establishments in California